Emil Grigoryevich Gilels (Russian: Эми́ль Григо́рьевич Ги́лельс; 19 October 1916 – 14 October 1985) was a Russian pianist. He is widely regarded as one of the greatest pianists of all time.

Early life and education 
Gilels was born to a Jewish family on 19 October 1916 (6 October, Old Style) in Odessa (then part of the Russian Empire, and now Ukraine) to Gesya and Grigory Gilels. His father worked as a clerk in a sugar refinery. His sister Elizaveta, three years his junior, was a renowned violinist.

A quick learner, he was playing all three volumes of Loeschhorn's studies within a few months, and soon afterwards Clementi and Mozart sonatinas. Gilels later credited this strict training with Tkach for establishing the foundation of his technique. In turn, Tkach commented of Gilels, using a diminutive, "Milya Gilels possesses the abilities of one who is born solely for the purpose of becoming a pianist, and that with the required attention to his development, the USSR would in the future enrich itself with the acquisition of a world-renowned pianist."

In May 1929, aged 12, Gilels gave his first public concert. Under the tutelage of Reingbald, Gilels broadened his range of cultural interests, with a particular aptitude for history and literature. In 1932, Arthur Rubinstein visited the Odessa Conservatory and met Gilels, and the two of them remained friends through the remainder of Rubinstein's life. Like Tkach, Reingbald carefully guided Gilels in terms of allowing him to give live concerts, and protected her student from excessive concert performances. He competed in the All-Soviet piano competition, despite being below the age limit to participate, but won a scholarship from the jury.

In 1932, Gilels first visited Heinrich Neuhaus. In 1933, Gilels participated in the First All-Union Competition of Performers in Moscow, and won first prize by unanimous decision. This win made Gilels famous throughout the USSR, and led to a nationwide concert tour. However, the stresses of touring led Gilels to curtail his touring and to return to Odessa, to conclude his studies, even declining an invitation to transfer to the Moscow Conservatory. Gilels subsequently regarded Reingbald as his true teacher, mentor and lifelong friend.

Gilels graduated from the Odessa Conservatory in the autumn of 1935. Subsequently, he was accepted into the class of Heinrich Neuhaus as a postgraduate student at the Moscow Conservatory, and Gilels renewed his commitment to giving concerts. In 1936, he participated in his first international competition, the International Vienna Music Academy Competition. Gilels took the second place award, while his friend and fellow student Yakov Flier was the first prize winner. Two years later, in 1938, both Gilels and Flier participated in the Ysaÿe International Festival (Queen Elisabeth Competition) in Brussels. Gilels was awarded first prize, and Flier took third prize. Gilels completed his studies in Moscow in 1938.

Career
Following his activities in Brussels, a scheduled tour and American debut at the 1939 New York World's Fair was aborted because of the outbreak of the Second World War. Sergei Rachmaninoff, living in exile from Russia, had heard of the reputation of Gilels, and began to listen to Gilels' radio performances. Rachmaninoff subsequently regarded Gilels as his pianistic successor, and sent him his medal and diploma. This medal, engraved with the profile of Anton Rubinstein, and the diploma were once presented to Rachmaninoff to symbolize his succession from Rubinstein, and Rachmaninoff himself added Gilels’ name to the document. Gilels treasured these relics all his life.

In 1944, Gilels premiered Prokofiev's 8th Piano Sonata. During World War II, Gilels entertained Soviet troops with morale-boosting open-air recitals on the frontline, of which film archive footage exists. In 1945, he formed a chamber music trio with the violinist Leonid Kogan (his brother-in-law) and the cellist Mstislav Rostropovich. Gilels was awarded the Stalin Prize in 1946. After the war, he toured the Soviet Bloc countries of Eastern Europe as a soloist. He also gave two-piano recitals with Yakov Flier, as well as concerts with his violinist sister, Elizaveta. He was chair of the jury of the International Tchaikovsky Competition at the inaugural competition in 1958, which awarded first prize to Van Cliburn. He presided over the competition for many years.

Gilels was one of the first Soviet artists, along with David Oistrakh, allowed to travel and give concerts in the West. His American debut was in October 1955, with the Philadelphia Orchestra and Eugene Ormandy. His British debut was in 1952 at the Royal Albert Hall. Gilels made his Salzburg Festival debut in 1969 with a piano recital of Weber, Prokofiev and Beethoven at the Mozarteum, followed by a performance of Beethoven's Third Piano Concerto with George Szell and the Vienna Philharmonic Orchestra.

In 1981, Gilels suffered a heart attack after a recital at the Concertgebouw in Amsterdam and suffered declining health thereafter. He died unexpectedly during a medical checkup in Moscow on 14 October 1985, only a few days before his 69th birthday. Sviatoslav Richter, who knew Gilels well and was a fellow-student in the class of Heinrich Neuhaus at the Moscow Conservatory, believed that Gilels was killed accidentally when a drug was wrongly injected during a routine checkup, at the Kremlin hospital. However, Danish composer and writer Karl Aage Rasmussen, in his biography of Richter, denies this possibility and contends that it was just a false rumour.

Gilels was married twice. He was first married to pianist Rosa Tamarkina in 1940. His second wife was Fariset (Lala) Hutsistova, a graduate of Moscow Conservatoire, whom he married in 1947. They had a daughter, Elena, a pianist who graduated from Flier’s class at the Moscow Conservatoire, and who performed and recorded with her father.

Recordings
Gilels is universally admired for his superb technical control and burnished tone. Gilels had a repertoire ranging from baroque to late Romantic and 20th century classical composers. His interpretations of the central German-Austrian classics formed the core of his repertoire, in particular Beethoven, Brahms, and Schumann; but he was equally illuminative with Scarlatti and 20th-century composers such as Debussy, Rachmaninoff, and Prokofiev. His recordings of Liszt's Hungarian Rhapsody No. 9 and Sonata in B minor have acquired classic status in some circles.

Gilels recordings for most of his recording history were for the state record company for classical music repertoire, Melodiya. These recordings, in turn, were licensed in the west under EMI Records, and in the United States under Angel Records (and EMI's budget Seraphim Records). In 2013 Warner Classics absorbed EMI Classics, thereby acquiring the bulk of Gilels' recordings.

Gilels was in the midst of completing a recording cycle of Beethoven's piano sonatas for the German record company Deutsche Grammophon when he died unexpectedly in a hospital in Moscow. His recording of the "Hammerklavier" Sonata received a Gramophone Award in 1984. Gilels recorded with his daughter, including Mozart's double piano concerto with Karl Böhm and the Vienna Philharmonic and Schubert's Fantasie in F minor for piano duet. He also made some chamber-music recordings with the violinist Leonid Kogan and the cellist Mstislav Rostropovich.

Notable recordings 
 1935Liszt: Fantasia on Themes from Mozart's Marriage of Figaro
 1951Liszt: Hungarian Rhapsody No. 9
 1954Saint-Saëns: Piano Concerto No. 2 in G minor, Op. 22 (cond. Cluytens)*
 1954Medtner: Piano Sonata No. 5 in G Minor, Op. 22
 1955Tchaikovsky: Piano Concerto No. 1 [cond. Fritz Reiner]
 1955Rachmaninoff: Piano Concerto No. 3 in D minor, Op. 30 (cond. Cluytens)
 1957Beethoven: Piano Concerto No. 4 (cond. Ludwig)
 1957Scriabin: Piano Sonata No. 4 in F sharp major, Op. 30*
 1957Weinberg: Piano Sonata No. 4 in B Minor
 1968Beethoven: Piano Concertos 1–5; solo piano pieces (Beethoven) (Cleveland Orchestra cond. George Szell)
 1958Brahms: Piano Concerto No. 2 in B flat major, Op. 83 (cond. Reiner)
 1961Bach: Prelude in B minor (BWV 855; arr. Siloti) (Moscow)*
 1968Medtner: Piano Sonata No. 10 in A minor, Op. 38 No. 1 ("Sonata Reminiscenza") (Moscow)*
 1968Liszt: Rhapsodie espagnole (Leningrad)*
 1971Brahms: Piano Concerto No. 2 in B flat major, Op. 83 (cond. Mario Rossi) (Köln)*
 1970Beethoven: Piano Concerto No. 3 in C Minor, Op. 37, Live Recording Lausanne, (Orchestre National de l'ORTF), (Claves Records)
 1972Tchaikovsky: Piano Concerto No. 2 in G major, Op. 44 (cond. Maazel)
 1972Brahms: Piano Concerto No. 1 in D minor, Op. 15 and Piano Concerto No. 2 in B flat major, Op. 83 (cond. Jochum)
 1973Beethoven: Piano Sonata No. 23 in F minor, Op. 57 ("Appassionata")
 1973Debussy: Images, Book 1*
 1973Mozart: Piano Concerto No. 27 in B flat major, K595 (cond. Boehm)
 1974Grieg: Lyric Pieces
 1974Prokofiev: Sonata No. 3 in a minor, Op. 28 (Köln)*
 1974Prokofiev: Sonata No. 8 in B flat major, Op. 84
 1976Schubert: Forellenquintett ("Trout Quintet") Quintet for Piano, Violin, Violoncello, and Contrabass in A major D667 (with Amadeus Quartet)
 1977Rachmaninoff, Prelude in C-sharp minor Op. 3 No. 2 (Moscow)*
 1978Chopin: Piano Sonata No. 3 in B minor, Op. 58
 1979Tchaikovsky: Piano Concerto No. 1 (New York)*
 1982Beethoven: Piano Sonata No. 29 in B flat major, Op. 106 Hammerklavier (Berlin)
 1984Beethoven: Piano Sonata No. 29 (Moscow)*
 1984Scriabin: Piano Sonata No. 3 in F-sharp minor, Op. 23 (Moscow)*
 1984Schumann: Symphonic Studies (Live in concert in Japan – his final concerts)

Prizes, awards and honors

Soviet Union
 1st Prize, All-Soviet Union Piano Competition, 1933
 2nd Prize, Vienna International Piano Competition, 1936
 1st Prize, Concours Eugène Ysaÿe, Brussels, 1938
 Stalin Prize, USSR, 1946
 People's Artist of the USSR, 1954
 Three Orders of Lenin, USSR, including 1961
 Lenin Prize, 1962
 Hero of Socialist Labour, 1976
 Order of the Red Banner of Labour
 Order of the Friendship of Peoples
 Order of the Badge of Honour

Foreign
 Commandeur, 1967
 Gold Medal of the City of Paris, France
 Order of Leopold (Belgium)
 Honorary Member, Accademia Nazionale di Santa Cecilia, Rome
 Honorary Member, Royal Academy of Music, London
 Honorary Professor, Franz Liszt Academy of Music, Budapest

Notes

References

External links 
 
 Emil Gilels: a Discography
 ICA Artists page on recording, catalogue number ICAC 5108
 Gramophone magazine (UK) page on Gilels

1916 births
1985 deaths
Musicians from Odesa
People from Odessky Uyezd
Odesa Jews
Communist Party of the Soviet Union members
Soviet classical pianists
Jewish classical pianists
Ukrainian classical pianists
Russian classical pianists
Moscow Conservatory alumni
Honorary Members of the Royal Academy of Music
Honorary members of the Accademia Nazionale di Santa Cecilia
Prize-winners of the Queen Elisabeth Competition
Heroes of Socialist Labour
People's Artists of the USSR
Stalin Prize winners
Lenin Prize winners
Recipients of the Order of Friendship of Peoples
Recipients of the Order of Lenin
Recipients of the Order of the Red Banner of Labour
RCA Victor artists
Columbia Records artists
Deutsche Grammophon artists
Angel Records artists